Leptorrhamphus is an extinct monospecific genus of gavialoid crocodilian that lived during the Middle to Late Miocene in what is now Argentina. Fossils have been found in the formation then named Entrerriana Formation, in modern literature referred to as the Ituzaingó Formation. The type species is L. entrerrianus, named after the formation in 1890. It is now thought to be a nomen dubium.

References 

Crocodilians
Miocene crocodylomorphs
Miocene reptiles of South America
Neogene Argentina
Fossils of Argentina
Fossil taxa described in 1890
Nomina dubia